The Today programme on BBC Radio 4 in the UK hands over the editorship of the flagship programme to notable outsiders for the week between Christmas and New Year. This is the full list of the individuals involved since the practice was started in 2003 by Peter Hanington.

2003 guest editors:
 Monica Ali 
 Norman Tebbit
 Thom Yorke
 Gillian Reynolds
 Stephen Hawking
 
2004 guest editors:
 Bono
 Richard Branson
 Anthony Minghella
 Sarah Ferguson, Duchess of York
 Onora O'Neill, Baroness O'Neill of Bengarve
 
2005 guest editors:
 David Blunkett
 Anna Ford
 Queen Noor of Jordan
 Steve Chandra Savale, member of the band Asian Dub Foundation
 Sir John Bond, Chairman of HSBC
 
2006 guest editors:
 Yoko Ono
 Sir Clive Woodward
 Zac Goldsmith
 Rowan Williams
 Allan Leighton

2007 Guest Editors
 
 Stella Rimington
 Damon Albarn
 Peter Hennessy
 Sir Martin Evans
 Richard Lewis, Samantha Gainard and Paul Amphlett of Dyfed-Powys Police  as nominated by Today Programme Listeners

2008 Guest Editors
 
 Zadie Smith
 Cardinal Cormac Murphy-O'Connor
 Jarvis Cocker
 Sir Win Bischoff
 Zaha Hadid

2009 Guest Editors
 Martin Rees
 David Hockney
 Tony Adams
 PD James
 Robert Wyatt
 Shirley Williams

2010 Guest Editors

 Diana Athill
 Colin Firth
 Sam Taylor Wood
 Richard Ingrams
 Dame Clara Furse

2011 Guest Editors

 Sebastian Coe
 Mo Ibrahim
 Tracey Emin
 Sir Victor Blank
 Baroness Boothroyd
 Stewart Lee

2012 Guest Editors

 Mass Observation
 Sir Paul Nurse
 Melinda Gates
 Dame Ann Leslie
 Benjamin Zephaniah
 Al Murray

2013 Guest Editors

 Sir Tim Berners Lee
 Michael Palin
 Eliza Manningham Buller
 Antony Jenkins
 PJ Harvey

2014 Guest Editors

 John Bercow
 Tracey Thorn
 Mervyn King, Baron King of Lothbury
 Lenny Henry
 Elizabeth Butler-Sloss, Baroness Butler-Sloss

2015 Guest Editors

 Michael Sheen
 Sir Bradley Wiggins
 Miriam González Durántez
 David Adjaye
 Baroness Jane Campbell
 Lord Browne

2016 Guest Editors
 Nicola Adams
 Carey Mulligan
 Helena Morrissey
 Sally Davies
 John Shields, a member of the programme's staff, edited a broadcast from Hull, looking forward to Hull UK City of Culture 2017

2017 Guest Editors
 Tamara Rojo
 Prince Harry
 Ben Okri
 Baroness Trumpington
 AI Robot

2018 Guest Editors
David Dimbleby 
Kamila Shamsie 
Martha Lane Fox
Angelina Jolie 
Chidera Eggerue  
Andrew Roberts 
Outer Space

2019 guest editors:

Grayson Perry
Brenda Hale
Greta Thunberg
George the Poet
Charles Moore

2020 Guest Editors

Lewis Hamilton
Prue Leith
Margaret Atwood
Evan Spiegel
Sir Jeremy Farrar
Reverend Rose Hudson-Wilkin

2021 Guest Editors

Raheem Sterling
General Sir Nick Carter
Mina Smallman
James Rebanks
Dr Jane Goodall
Jacky Wright
Lord Dobbs

2022 Guest Editors
Ian Botham
Jamie Oliver
Nazanin Zaghari-Ratcliffe
Björn Ulvaeus
Sir Jeremy Fleming
Anne-Marie Imafidon
Dame Sharon White

References

BBC-related lists
Radio editors